Olgasolaris is a genus of small, limpet-like sea snails, marine gastropod mollusks in the family Phenacolepadidae.

Species
Species within the genus Olgasolaris include:
 Olgasolaris tollmanni L. Beck, 1992

References

External links

Phenacolepadidae